John Ewing (June 1, 1863 – April 23, 1895), nicknamed "Long John", was an American professional baseball player.  He was a pitcher over four seasons (1888–1891) with the Louisville Colonels, New York Giants of the Players' League, and New York Giants of the National League. Prior to that he was an outfielder in 1883 and 1884. In six years in the major leagues, Ewing played in four different leagues (National League, Union Association, American Association, Players' League).

Ewing compiled a 53–63 career record in 129 appearances, with a 3.68 earned run average and 525 strikeouts. In 1891 he led the National League in ERA (a retroactive ranking; ERA was not tabulated in that era) while playing for New York.

Ewing was used as a first base umpire in an American Association game on August 15, 1889.

He was the brother of Hall of Fame catcher and infielder Buck Ewing. The brothers played on the same team for two seasons, and Buck managed the 1890 Giants team for which John pitched.

Ewing was born in Cincinnati and died in Denver, Colorado at the age of 31.

See also

List of Major League Baseball annual ERA leaders

References

External links

1863 births
1895 deaths
Major League Baseball pitchers
Baseball players from Cincinnati
St. Louis Browns (AA) players
Cincinnati Outlaw Reds players
Washington Nationals (UA) players
Louisville Colonels players
New York Giants (PL) players
New York Giants (NL) players
National League ERA champions
New Orleans Pelicans (baseball) players
Memphis Grays players
Major League Baseball umpires
19th-century baseball umpires